Charara is a town in Mashonaland West province in Zimbabwe.

Populated places in Mashonaland West Province